James Hardin Younger (January 15, 1848 – October 19, 1902) was a notable American outlaw and member of the James–Younger Gang. He was the brother of Cole, John and Bob Younger.

Life
Born in Missouri on January 15, 1848. Jim Younger was the ninth of fourteen children born to Henry Washington Younger and Bersheba Leighton Fristoe. With his brother Cole, he joined the Confederate Army during the American Civil War, eventually becoming a member of Quantrill's Raiders in 1864. Jim was later captured by Union troops, in the same ambush that resulted in William Quantrill's death, and was imprisoned until the war's end.

After the war Jim tried his hand at various activities, including starting a horse ranch.  In 1873 he joined the James–Younger Gang, which was founded by Cole, along with Frank and Jesse James.

It's uncertain how much time he spent with the gang, but he was present when his brother John was killed by Pinkertons in Roscoe, Missouri in 1874.  He left the gang and spent the next two years working a ranch in San Luis Obispo, California.

Return to James–Younger Gang and death
Jim returned to the gang in time to join the ill-fated 1876 bank job in Northfield, Minnesota.  Part of his jaw was shot off and he was captured and sentenced to life imprisonment. Along with Cole, he was paroled in 1901. After his release he became engaged to Alix Mueller, who had met him in prison 20 years after the Northfield robbery. Due to the terms of his parole, however, Jim couldn't marry. He committed suicide on October 19, 1902.  His body was returned to Lee's Summit, Missouri for burial.

Film and television depiction
In 1941, Younger was portrayed by actor Arthur Kennedy in the film Bad Men of Missouri.

In 1950, Dewey Martin played Younger in the film Kansas Raiders, about his time spent with Quantrill's Raiders.

In 1954, Sheb Wooley played Younger in an episode of Jim Davis's syndicated western television series, Stories of the Century.

In the 1972 film The Great Northfield Minnesota Raid he was portrayed by Luke Askew.

In the 1980 film The Long Riders he was portrayed by Keith Carradine.

In the TV show Dr. Quinn, Medicine Woman, he was portrayed in the episode "Baby Outlaws S3E21" by Donnie Jeffcoat

In the 2001 film American Outlaws'' he was portrayed by Gregory Smith.

References

James-Younger gang at civilwarstlouis.com

External links
Younger family genealogy on the official website for the family of Jesse James: Stray Leaves, A James Family in America Since 1650
Minnesota Historical Society History Topics: Northfield Raid and James-Younger Gang

1848 births
1902 suicides
People from Lee's Summit, Missouri
Outlaws of the American Old West
Bushwhackers
James–Younger Gang
American bank robbers
American prisoners sentenced to life imprisonment
Prisoners sentenced to life imprisonment by Minnesota
People paroled from life sentence
Suicides by firearm in Minnesota
People of Missouri in the American Civil War
1902 deaths